The Board of Joint Chiefs of Staff (JUJEM) was the highest joint military command body of the Spanish Armed Forces that operated between 1977 and 2005. The Board, subject to the political dependence of the Prime Minister, constituted the highest collegiate body of the chain of military command of Army, the Navy and the Air Force. The Board consisted of a president, selected from among lieutenant generals or admirals of the three branches of the Armed Forces, their chiefs of staff (Army, Navy and the Air Force) and a secretary. The president had to belong to the Group of Arms Command or Group "A" and was also chief of the Defence High Command, until the dissolution of this body in 1980. The Board also had a General Headquarters, created in 1980 as a result of the dissolution of the Defence High Command, where the organs of aid to the command were integrated. Of the General Headquarters of the JUJEM they depended:

The General Technical Secretariat of the General Headquarters.
The Joint Staff of the Board, constituted in a balanced way by members of each of the three branches of the Armed Forces. The command of the Board fell to a divisional general or vice admiral of the same scale and group as the members of the Board, at the proposal of the same.
The Higher Center for National Defence Studies.
The Command of the General Headquarters.
Legal Service.

After its dissolution, the functions of the Board were assumed by the current Defence Staff.

Functions 
The most important functions entrusted to the Board of Joint Chiefs of Staff were the following:

 Provide technical advice in the preparation of the military policy to be formulated by the National Defence Board.
 Formulate and propose, for approval by the Government, the Joint Strategic Plan, determining, within it, the joint objective of the Force.
 Exercise the strategic direction of said Plan and coordinate the plans of the three branches of the Armed Forces derived from it.
 Establish the doctrine of Unified Action and, where appropriate, the doctrine of Combined Action with the Armies of other countries.
 Prepare combined plans with armies of other nations, when said plans were joint.
 Propose to the Prime Minister the creation of the unified and specified commands, as well as the persons who should exercise it and who, under the direct dependency of the Joint Chiefs of Staff, were necessary for the execution of the Joint Strategic Plan, defining mission, means and areas of action.
 Promote, in coordination with the National Mobilization Service, the preparation of integrated plans for general mobilization.

List of presidents of the Board of Joint Chiefs of Staff 
After 1984, the Chairman of the Joint Chiefs of Staff was the Chief of the Defence Staff.

† denotes people who died in office.

Timeline

See also 
 Defence High Command
 Defence Staff (Spain)
 Chief of the Defence Staff (Spain)
 Spanish Armed Forces

Notes

Sources and references 
The content of this article incorporates material published in the Boletín Oficial del Estado, which is in the public domain in accordance with the provisions of Article 13 of the Spanish Intellectual Property Law.
 Real Decreto-ley 11/1977, de 8 de febrero, por el que se institucionaliza la Junta de Jefes de Estado Mayor y se regulan sus atribuciones, funciones y responsabilidades. The Spanish Official Gazette núm. 34, de 9 de febrero de 1977, página 3135.
 Real Decreto 1125/1980, de 13 de junio, por el que se crea el Cuartel General de la Junta de Jefes de Estado Mayor. The Spanish Official Gazette núm. 143, de 14 de junio de 1980, página 13287.

Military of Spain
Staff (military)
1977 establishments in Spain
2005 disestablishments in Spain